Anthidium sublustre is a species of bee in the family Megachilidae, the leaf-cutter, carder, or mason bees.

References

sublustre
Insects described in 1982